Radical 101 or radical use meaning "" is one of the 23 Kangxi radicals (214 radicals in total) composed of 5 strokes.

In the Kangxi Dictionary, there are 10 characters (out of 49,030) to be found under this radical.

Evolution

Derived characters

Literature

References

101